David Edward McCleave (24 December 1911 – 19 May 1988) was an English boxer who competed for Great Britain in the 1932 Summer Olympics. He was born in Battersea. He fought as '''Dave McCleave.

Boxing career
In 1932 he finished fourth in the welterweight class. He was not able to compete in the bronze medal bout against Bruno Ahlberg. At the 1934 Empire Games he won the gold medal in the welterweight class after winning the final against Dick Barton.

He won the 1932 and 1934 Amateur Boxing Association British welterweight titles and the 1931 lightweight title, when boxing out of the Lynn ABC.

Personal life
In the 1950s he was the landlord of the Union Tavern Pub Camberwell New Road. It was a boxing pub where David Benjamin Gray was compere and manager with his wife Irene Alice Gray.

References

External links

1911 births
1988 deaths
Boxers from Greater London
English male boxers
Welterweight boxers
Olympic boxers of Great Britain
Boxers at the 1932 Summer Olympics
Boxers at the 1934 British Empire Games
Commonwealth Games gold medallists for England
Commonwealth Games medallists in boxing
Medallists at the 1934 British Empire Games